Ciebłowice Duże – village in the administrative district of Gmina Tomaszów Mazowiecki, within Tomaszów County, Lodz Voivodeship. It is located on the southern edge of the Spała Landscape Park.

History 

 The first historical reference dates from 1389. The village belonged to the bishops of Kujawy who resided in Wolborzu. It was settled by settlers from the Sieradz land.
 In 1534, there were 18.5 meadows used by 19 serfs, 1 farmer and mill.
 In 1859 r. the Unewel municipality was created, which included Ciebłowice.
 In November 1941, a labor camp of the Construction Service (Baudienst) was created here. There were about 400 forced laborers in it. "Junacy" worked on the construction of the Tomaszów Mazowiecki – Radom railway route. The camp was liquidated on the night of October 16, 1943 by the partisan detachment of Lieutenant Witold Kucharski "Wichra". Forced workers were freed and camp barracks were set on fire. Fisher camp commandant was shot because he was guilty of the death of one of the prisoners. During the action, 6 rifles, 2 guns, ammunition and equipment of the camp were acquired.
 In 1975, the Tomaszów Mazowiecki commune was established, to which the village now belongs. 
 In the years 1975–1998, the town was administratively part of the province of Piotrków.
 In 1993 – Unveiling of a plaque commemorating the liberation of a labor camp.
 In 1994 – Beginning of the construction of the water supply.
 In 1996 – Putting the water supply into operation.
 In 1998 – Beginning of the construction of a sewage system.

Interesting places 

 Cross and Mound of Freedom Tadeusz Kościuszko.
 The mound was built up by the hands of schoolchildren from Ciebowice in remembrance of expulsion of their enemies from Poland in 1920. The initiator of the construction of the memorial – A. Kolędowska
 Monument and cross in honor of the heroes of the Home Army who died in the country and abroad. The monument was funded by the People's Guard
 The shrine with the inscription "From the air, hunger and fire, save us, Lord." A plaque commemorating the liberation of the Nazi labor camp by the chapel.
 In the village there is a complex of archaeological sites from the period of Roman influence.
 Peatbog "Kaczeniec".
 Swamp "Smug" – a remnant of gravel mining under the railway embankment, now the place of existence of cranes.
 The "Carski Trakt" runs through the village – a road that was crossed from the Jeleń car railway station going to hunts to Spała.

Famous characters 

 Błażej Stolarski
 Karolina Bosiek
 Adrian Rubaj

Culture and social activities 

 "Ciebłowianie" – a folk band led by Mrs. Katarzyna Małek
 O4D – blues band
 Circle of Country Housewives – cultural and educational activities

Infrastructure 

 Sewage system with sewage pumping stations
 Biological treatment plant (type: Bioclere)
 Sidewalks
 Stops with bays for buses
 Containers for separate waste collection
 Railway line no. 22 Tomaszów Mazowiecki – Radom.

References 

Villages in Tomaszów Mazowiecki County